Bishop B. D. Prasada Rao (born 13.8.1952) is Bishop Emeritus - in - Rayalaseema Diocese of the Church of South India and past ex officio member of the Church of South India Synod for the period 2013-2019.  He retired on attaining superannuation on 13 August 2019.

Ministerial formation
After early scholastic and collegiate studies leading to degrees in Sciences and Education, Prasad Rao discerned his avocation towards priesthood.

Graduate
Prasada Rao had his ministerial formation at the Andhra Christian Theological College, Secunderabad, affiliated to the nation's first University, the Senate of Serampore College (University), where he studied Bachelor of Divinity during the years 1976-1979 under learned faculty, notably, Victor Premasagar, CSI, G. Solomon, STBC and G. Babu Rao, CBCNC then Old Testament Scholars at the Protestant Regional Theologiate in Secunderabad after which the Senate of Serampore College (University) awarded him a graduate degree under the Registrarship of D. S. Satyaranjan, IPC.

Post graduate
After serving in parishes in Rayalaseema, Prasad Rao was sent for postgraduate studies to the United Theological College, Bangalore, where he studied Master of Theology degree from 1987-1989 during the Principalship of E. C. John, a leading Old Testament Scholar. Rao worked out a dissertation entitled The socio-cultural approach to Christian education: Guidelines for a curriculum for youth in Rayalaseema diocese of the Church of South India During the successive convocation of the University, Prasad Rao was awarded a degree again during the Registrarship of D. S. Satyaranjan, IPC.  In 1999, Prasad Rao's article, Pastoral Care to the Pastors appeared in the National Council of Churches Review.

Bishopric
On 5 May 2013, the Most Reverend G. Devakadasham, Moderator principally consecrated Prasad Rao with other co-consecrator, the Right Reverend G. Dyvasirvadam, Deputy Moderator at the CSI-Christ Church/Cathedral, Kadapa.

References

Christian clergy from Andhra Pradesh
Telugu people
21st-century Anglican bishops in India
Anglican bishops of Rayalaseema
Indian Christian theologians
Senate of Serampore College (University) alumni
Living people
1952 births
Indian bishops